Al-Jolan Sport Club, is an Iraqi football team based in Fallujah, Al-Anbar, that plays in Iraq Division One.

History
The club was founded in 2004, and it is considered one of the most important clubs in Fallujah. It has teams in various sports, including football, basketball, volleyball, handball, table tennis, chess, taekwondo, kickboxing, swimming, bodybuilding, weightlifting, and track and field, some of which have won multiple championships. The football team promoted for the Iraqi Premier League in the 2006 season, but withdrew due to poor financial condition.

Managerial history
 Khalid Mohammed Sabbar
 Saadi Awad
 Amer Khamis
 Shukor Ali
 Haider Obeid
 Yasser Raad
 Ahmed Mnajed
 Hadi Mtanesh 
 Ali Wahab
 Mustafa Karim

See also 
 2020–21 Iraq FA Cup
 2021–22 Iraq FA Cup
 2022–23 Iraq FA Cup

References

External links
 Al-Jolan SC on Goalzz.com

2004 establishments in Iraq
Association football clubs established in 2004
Football clubs in Al-Anbar